Return of the Big Money Sound is London grime collective Roll Deep's third album, released by Roll Deep Recordings in 2008. The singles from it are Do Me Wrong featuring Janee and Movin' In Circle/Club 7 featuring Kivanc. The album has sold over 6,000 copies in the UK.

Track listing 

2008 albums
Roll Deep albums